"Everything Burns" is a song by American guitarist Ben Moody and American singer Anastacia for the soundtrack to the film Fantastic Four (2005) based on the Marvel comics of the same name. Released on June 20, 2005, "Everything Burns" became a top-10 hit in five European countries, including Italy, where it peaked at number two. The song's music video, directed by Antti Jokinen, was shot on April 30 and May 1, 2005, at the Culver Studios in Los Angeles.

The song was originally recorded with Canadian singer Avril Lavigne. Moody recorded a version with Hana Pestle for his 2008 EP, Mutiny Bootleg E.P.. American Idol finalist James Durbin covered the song for his 2011 debut album Memories of a Beautiful Disaster. Moody re-recorded the song in his solo album You Can't Regret What You Don't Remember, retitled "Everything Burns (In Memoriam)".

Track listings
 European CD single
 "Everything Burns" (album version) – 3:43
 "Everything Burns" (instrumental) – 3:43
 "Everything Burns" (video)

 European CD maxi single
 "Everything Burns" (album version) – 3:43
 "Everything Burns" (instrumental) – 3:43
 "Everything Burns" (video mix) – 3:44
 "Everything Burns" (video)

Charts

Weekly charts

Year-end charts

Sales

Release history

References

2005 singles
Anastacia songs
Fantastic Four (film series)
Male–female vocal duets
Songs written by Ben Moody
Wind-up Records singles